In computational complexity theory, LOGCFL is the complexity class that contains all decision problems that can be reduced in logarithmic space to a context-free language. This class is situated between NL and AC1, in the sense that it contains the former and is contained in the latter. Problems that are complete for LOGCFL include many problems whose instances can be characterized by acyclic hypergraphs:
 evaluating acyclic Boolean conjunctive queries
 checking the existence of a homomorphism between two acyclic relational structures
 checking the existence of solutions of acyclic constraint satisfaction problems

See also

 List of complexity classes

External links
 

Complexity classes